Gobio coriparoides is a species of gudgeon, a small freshwater fish in the family Cyprinidae. It is found in China.

References

 

Gobio
Fish described in 1925
Cyprinid fish of Asia
Fish of China